Navajosphenodon is an extinct genus of sphenodontid reptile from the Early Jurassic Kayenta Formation of Arizona, United States. It is known from a fully articulated skeleton, and is similar in many aspects to the extant tuatara, both belonging to the Sphenodontinae, including sharing a complete lower temporal bar. It is one of the oldest known sphenodontines.

References 

Jurassic lepidosaurs
Sphenodontia
Fossil taxa described in 2022